Sindkhed Raja is a town and a municipal council in Buldhana district in the Indian state of Maharashtra. It is the birthplace of Rajmata Jijabai, mother of chhatrapati Shivaji maharaj. Sindkhed was ruled by Koli Chieftain.

Etymology
There are many legends associated with name of this city. According to one legend, the name Sindkhed is derived from the name of king Sindhurama, who is said to have established this city in ancient time. While other believes that this area was known as 'Siddha Kshetra' (holy land of seers), which over a period of time got abbreviated to Sindkhed.

History

Not much is known about history of this place in ancient time and the Middle ages. In 1450 A.D., this area was given as jagir to local Kaji by Ala-ud-Din Ahmed Shah Bahmani of the Bahmani Sultanate. By 1550, this area came under rule of powerful Jadhav dynasty, which ruled the paragana of Sindkhed until 1724. During this period, they kept on shuffling their suzerainty with Mughal Empire and Ahmadnagar Sultanate as per situation. Emergence of Nizam of Hyderabad in south India changed political dynamics in this area.  The area come under control Nizam by 1724. During the later part of 18th century, this area came under influence of the Shinde dynasty, which ruled it for about 60 years. In 1803, the Nizam of Hyderabad recaptured Sindkhed and restored the rule of Jadhav dynasty. The family lost possessions of the city in 1851 owing to an act of rebellion by Arab troops under their command leading to Sindkhed's downfall. After the decline of the Nizam's rule, this area came under direct British rule.

Tourist attractions

Jijau Palace 
Sindkhed Raja is famous for the palace of Lakhojirao Jadhav. This palace was built in the late sixteenth century by Lakhuji Jadhav, father of Jijabai. Jijabai was born in this place on 12 January 1598.

Jijau Shrushti 
Jijau Shrushti is a Jijabai's memorial, it is situated on a hill near Sindkhed Raja. It is famous for Jijabi's birth anniversary celebration events.

Demographics 
 India census, Sindkhed Raja had a population of 16,434. Males constitute 52% of the population and females 48%. Literacy rate of Sindkhed Raja city is 82.03% marginally lower than state average of 82.34%. In Sindkhed Raja, Male literacy is around 89.58% while female literacy rate is 73.97%. About 75% of population is employed in agriculture sector.

Administration 
Sindkhed Raja is an administrative headquarters of Sindkhed Raja Taluka.

Office of Sub-Divisional Officer (Revenue) 
During reorganization of revenue Sub-Divisions during 2013, Government of Maharashtra established a new revenue sub-divisional office at Sindkhed Raja. Its jurisdiction includes Sindkhed Raja and Deulgaon Raja Tahsils. The office was inaugurated by then guardian minister of district Mr. Hasan Mushrif on 15 August 2013. Dr. Vivek Ghodke was the first Sub-Divisional Magistrate of Sindkhed Raja.

Cultural legacy 
Sindkhed Raja is the birthplace of Jijabai, mother of Maratha king Shivaji, (founder of Maratha empire).

 In the state of Maharashtra Jijabai is regarded as an ideal mother. Her upbringing of Shivaji is a subject of folklore.
 The 2011, Marathi film Rajmata Jijau is based upon life of Jijabai.

See also
 Sindkhed Raja (Vidhan Sabha constituency)

References 

Cities and towns in Buldhana district
Talukas in Maharashtra